Parivesh is a quarterly literary magazine published in Gujarati language. The first issue was published in December 2012. It is edited by Rajesh Vankar.

Content 
The magazine publishes poetry, stories, critical essays, book reviews, plays in Gujarati. It also publishes research papers and articles on Gujarati literature, folk literature and world literature.

See also
 Dalitchetna
 Shabdasrishti

References

2012 establishments in Gujarat
Gujarati-language magazines
Literary magazines published in India
Quarterly magazines published in India
Magazines established in 2012